Alfonso Guerra González (born 31 May 1940) is a Spanish politician. A leading member of the Spanish Socialist Workers' Party (PSOE), he served as vice president of the government (vicepresidente del Gobierno, i.e., equivalent to deputy prime minister) of Spain from 1982 to 1991, under the premiership of Felipe González. He represented Seville province in the Congress of Deputies from 1977 to 2015, and was the longest-serving deputy at the time of his departure.

In 1988 Guerra received an honorary degree from the Universidad Nacional Federico Villarreal in Lima, Peru, and he was awarded the Medaglia D'oro in 1984 by the Sapienza University of Rome.

Guerra was an extremely controversial politician, noted for his acid discourse against his opponents - which was criticised as demagogy by his political adversaries. He was forced to quit his position as vice-president after a financial scandal involving his brother Juan Guerra.

On 5 November 2014, Guerra announced that he would be resigning from congress at the end of the parliamentary session in December 2014. At the time of his resignation announcement, he was the longest serving member of congress.

References 

1940 births
Living people
People from Seville
University of Seville alumni
Spanish Socialist Workers' Party politicians
Members of the constituent Congress of Deputies (Spain)
Members of the 1st Congress of Deputies (Spain)
Members of the 2nd Congress of Deputies (Spain)
Members of the 3rd Congress of Deputies (Spain)
Members of the 4th Congress of Deputies (Spain)
Members of the 5th Congress of Deputies (Spain)
Members of the 6th Congress of Deputies (Spain)
Members of the 7th Congress of Deputies (Spain)
Members of the 8th Congress of Deputies (Spain)
Members of the 9th Congress of Deputies (Spain)
Deputy Prime Ministers of Spain
Spanish nationalists